Lucas & Steve is a Dutch DJ duo formed by Lucas de Wert and Steven Jansen from Maastricht.

History 
The duo was formed in 2010 and joined Spinnin' Records in December 2014. They released many singles on the sub-label Spinnin' Deep.

In 2014, they remixed the song "Alright" By Red Carpet.

They released "Summer On You" with Sam Feldt featuring Wulf (singer) and "Feel Alive" with Pep & Rash. Their song "Calling On You" featuring Jake Reese, debuted on a Billboard chart, at 40th on Dance/Mix Show Airplay. In 2018, they released their collaboration with Janieck called 'You Don't Have To Like It'.

In 2020, they released a track called Do It For You in collaboration with W&W. Throughout their career, they have also remixed songs by artists including Robin Schulz, Hardwell, Felix Jaehn with Lost Frequencies, Showtek and Laurent Wolf.

Discography

Albums

Singles

Charting singles

Non-charting singles

Remixes

Awards and nominations

DJ Magazine top 100 DJs

References

Notes
 A  "Calinda 2K15" did not enter the Ultratop 50, but peaked at number 86 on the Flemish Ultratip chart.
 B  "Make It Right" did not enter the Single Top 100, but peaked at number six on the Tipparade chart.
 C  "Make It Right" did not enter the Ultratop 50, but peaked at number 11 on the Walloon Dance Bubbling Under chart.
 D  "Summer on You" did not enter the Ultratop 50, but peaked at number 12 on the Flemish Ultratip chart.
 E  "Summer on You" did not enter the Ultratop 50, but peaked at number 11 on the Walloon Dance Bubbling Under chart.
 F  "You Don't Have to Like It" did not enter the Ultratop 50, but peaked at number 32 on the Flemish Ultratip chart.
 G  "Source" did not enter the Swedish Singellista Chart, but peaked at number 20 on the Swedish Heatseeker Chart.
 H  "Where Have You Gone (Anywhere)" did not enter the Ultratop 50, but peaked at number 12 on the Flemish Ultratip chart.
 I  "Perfect" did not enter the Ultratop 50, but peaked at number 12 on the Flemish Ultratip chart.
 J  "Perfect" did not enter the Ultratop 50, but peaked at number 28 on the Walloon Ultratip chart.
 K  "No Diggity" did not enter the Ultratop 50, but peaked at number 12 on the Flemish Ultratip chart.

Sources

External links
Official website
Beatport

Dutch DJs
Dutch house music groups
Electronic dance music duos
Dutch musical duos
Male musical duos
Spinnin' Records artists
Electronic dance music DJs
Remixers